is a Japanese 17th century architectural design manual. The manual was written by Heinouchi Yoshimasa and first handed by his son Masanobu Heinouchi in 1608 in five scroll formats.

The five volumes are composed of Monkishu (Kiwari for gates), Shakishu (Kiwari of Shrines), Doukishu (Kiwari of temples), Toukishu (Kiwari of Pagodas) and Den-okushu (Kiwari of residences). 

The earliest known copy of the text, which is owned by the University of Tokyo, was published sometime between 1697 and 1727.

References

Further reading
Coaldrake, William H. (1996). Architecture and Authority in Japan, Routledge, London. 
Coaldrake, William H. (1990). The Way Of The Carpenter. Tools and Japanese Architecture, Weatherhill, Tokyo. 

1608 books
Architecture books
Architecture in Japan
Japanese-language books
Japanese non-fiction books